Rooftopping sometimes called roofing refers to the unsecured ascent of rooftops, cranes, antennas, smokestacks, etc., usually illegally. Rooftoppers usually take photos or videos and panoramic photographs—either a selfie by themselves or with the help of an assistant/accomplice crew from a distance. The practice of scaling skyscrapers often results in security crackdowns and arrests.

Many people have died or been injured while rooftopping due to falling from a height.

Details
Rooftopping is chiefly an undertaking of younger people. Rooftoppers clandestinely access off-limits staircases, roof hatches, ladders, etc., and it incorporates some aspects of buildering. It is an offshoot of urban exploring, but is not universally condoned among urban explorers due to high risk of possibility of fatal injures. Because it is often practised in the pursuit of making viral-ready videos or photos, it tends to result in heightened security and greater restriction against access to desirable exploration venues.

In one report presented to American Educational Research Association in 1995 participants were suggested as thrill seekers who enjoy "high levels of stimulation and complexity" of thinking, although other theories explaining their motivation exist.

Rooftoppers usually take photos or videos and panoramic photographs—either a selfie by themselves or with the help of an assistant/accomplice crew from a distance. They often use helmet cameras for videos. Some also use quadcopter drones for exploration and recording.

There was a rooftopping "craze" in Russia around 2017.

Known rooftoppers

Ally Law, English YouTuber who makes rooftopping videos.
Mustang Wanted, real name Pavlo Ushivets, a Ukrainian rooftopper who has performed climbs and stunts around the world. On 19/20 August 2014, during the War in Donbass, he climbed the spire of Kotelnicheskaya Embankment Building in Moscow, Russia and painted the yellow star on the top of the spire in blue to make the colors of the Ukrainian flag on the star. Later he was prosecuted in absentia in Russia for this action that was qualified as a vandalism, and also awarded in Ukraine.
Angela Nikolau, a Russian model.
Kirill Oreshkin, the Moscow-based "Russian Spiderman"; has published pictures of himself in the midst of dangerous stunts on some of Russia's tallest buildings. Oreshkin started scaling buildings as a hobby in 2008 and videos of his ascents have also been posted on YouTube.
Vitaliy Raskalov and Vadim Makhorov, YouTube rooftoppers.
Vic Invades, New York urban explorer
Tom Ryaboi, a Canadian photographer who has been credited as a pioneer in the community. His photo "I'll Make You Famous" in 2011 was the first Rooftopping image to go viral.
Wu Yongning, known as the Chinese Superman; died in 2017 while performing a rooftopping stunt.

Injuries and deaths

Many people have died or been injured while rooftopping due to falling from a height.

See also

 List of selfie-related injuries and deaths
 Modern ruins
 Roof and tunnel hacking
 Ruins photography
 Unfinished building
 Urban exploration

References

External links
Verti-Go! Crazy Russian 'skywalkers' defy death & go viral News Video
USA Today on Rooftopping

Types of climbing
Urban exploration
Selfies
Articles containing video clips